Dave (David) Walsh is an American voice actor who is probably best known for doing the voice of the Blue Senturion in Power Rangers Turbo. He has done other voice acting in video games and animated cartoons.

Walsh has been involved in sound recording and ADR writing/directing. He was the ADR director for Power Rangers between Zeo and Time Force.

Filmography

Cartoon voice-overs
 Superman: The Animated Series - Captain Croissant (voice)
 Batman Beyond - Stage Manager, Boy Student, Dirk, Rocketeer (voices)
 Family Guy (ep: Fast Times at Buddy Cianci, Jr. High)

Live-action voice-over
 Big Bad Beetleborgs -  Skullhead (voice)
 Power Rangers Zeo - Cruel Chrome (voice, uncredited)
 Power Rangers Turbo - Blue Senturion (voice), Visceron (voice, uncredited)
 Power Rangers in Space - Blue Senturion (voice, uncredited)
 Power Rangers Wild Force (ep: Forever Red) - Automon (voice, uncredited)

Movie roles
 Batman Beyond: The Movie - Dirk (voice)

Video Game roles
 Star Wars Rogue Squadron III: Rebel Strike - Commander 5, Imperial Generic, Wingman 6
 Judge Dredd: Dredd Vs. Death - Additional Voices
 Shadow Of Rome - Additional Voices
 Neverwinter Nights 2 - Bishop, PC (Male Methodical Caster)
 Jade Empire - First Brother Kai, Philosopher Jiao, Additional Voices
 Driver Parallel Lines - TK

References

External links

Living people
American male voice actors
American voice directors
American television writers
Place of birth missing (living people)
Year of birth missing (living people)
American male screenwriters
American male television writers